Amentotaxus yunnanensis, the Yunnan catkin yew, is a species of conifer in the yew family, Taxaceae. It is native to Laos, Vietnam, and Guizhou and Yunnan in China.

Remaining populations are small and threatened by logging.

References

yunnanensis
Trees of Laos
Trees of China
Trees of Vietnam
Vulnerable plants
Taxonomy articles created by Polbot
Plants described in 1952